William Somersham,  D.D. was a priest and academic in the late 14th and early 15th centuries.

Somersham became a Fellow of Gonville Hall, Cambridge in 1376.  He was ordained in December that year; and held livings at Hockwold cum Wilton and Hevingham. He was Master of Gonville from 1412 until his death in 1416.

References 

Fellows of Gonville Hall, Cambridge
Masters of Gonville Hall, Cambridge
15th-century English people
14th-century English people
1412 deaths